The 2017 IPSC Rifle World Shoot I held at the Patriot Park in Kubinka, Moscow, Russia was the first IPSC Rifle World Shoot. The match consisted of 30 stages over 6 days and 591 competitors from 40 nations.

Originally the championship was planned to be held during 2016, but was rescheduled to 2017 in order to finish the construction of the new shooting range in Patriot Park near Moscow. The majority of targets were placed between 60 and 100 meters, but many stages also included targets between 200 and 300 meters.

Champions

Open 

The Semi Auto Open division had the largest match participation with 369 competitors (62.4%).

Individual

Teams Open

Standard 

The Semi Auto Standard division had the second largest match participation with 131 competitors (22.2%).

Individual

Teams Standard

Manual Open 
The Manual Action Open division had the third largest match participation with 52 competitors (8.8%). The Manual Action Standard 10 division had 10 competitors (1.7%) and was moved to Manual Open. Therefore, in total 62 competitors (10.5%) were scored in Manual Open.

Individual

Manual Standard 
The Manual Action Standard division had 29 competitors (4.9%).

Individual

Medal table

Shoot-Off side event 
The shoot-off side event was an audience friendly one-against-one elimination cup held after the main match. It consisted of quarter finals, semi-finals, bronze and gold finals. The top 16 overall in each division and top 8 category shooters within in each division was qualified, and the event was broadcast live with commentary on web television.

See also 
IPSC Rifle World Shoots
IPSC Shotgun World Shoot
IPSC Handgun World Shoots
IPSC Action Air World Shoot

References

 Official Live Results: 2017 Rifle World Shoot I
 Final results of the Rifle World Championship

External links 
 Official Match Webpage
 Facebook Page
 Information video (Russian with English subtitles)

2017
Shooting competitions in Russia
International sports competitions hosted by Russia
IPSC Rifle World Shoot
IPSC Rifle World Shoot
IPSC Rifle World Shoot
Sport in Moscow Oblast